Saint-Jean-Soleymieux is a commune in the Loire department in central France.

Population

International relations

Saint-Jean-Soleymieux is twinned with Allesley, near Coventry, United Kingdom.

See also
Communes of the Loire department

References

Communes of Loire (department)